The Importation of Silk Act 1482 (22 Edw. 4, c. 3) was an Act of the Parliament of England passed during the reign of Edward IV.

The Act prohibited the importation of foreign made silk in order to protect the English silk industry.

Notes

Acts of the Parliament of England
1482 in England
Protectionism
1480s in law